Acinetobacter harbinensis is a gram-negative and strictly aerobic bacterium from the genus Acinetobacter which has been isolated from water of the Songhua River in Harbin in China.

References

External links
Type strain of Acinetobacter harbinensis at BacDive -  the Bacterial Diversity Metadatabase	

Moraxellaceae
Bacteria described in 2014